Luigi Anaclerio (born 25 March 1981) is a former Italian footballer who played as a forward.

He is the elder brother of Michele Anaclerio.

Career

Bari
Anaclerio started his career at Bari at Serie A. He made his debut on 19 November 2000, against Lecce. After the relegation in 2001, Anaclerio played more regular with first team at 2001–02 Serie B season. In the 2nd half of 2002–03 season, he left on loan to Como, also at Serie B. In the next season he left for Treviso on loan.

He then returned to Bari in 2004, mainly as substitute player.

Verona
In July 2006, he joined Hellas Verona F.C. in co-ownership deal. One the same day Carlo Gervasoni moved to Bari also in co-ownership deal. After just played twice, he left for Perugia of Serie C1 on loan. He remained at Perugia in 2007–08 season.

In 2008–09 season, Anaclerio returned to Verona, now at Lega Pro Prima Divisione, played 11 times.

Andria BAT
In August 2009, he left for Andria BAT.

References

External links

http://aic.football.it/scheda/532/anaclerio-luigi.htm
http://www.gazzetta.it/Speciali/serie_b_2007/giocatori/anaclerio_lui.shtml
http://www.figc.it/nazionali/DettaglioConvocato?codiceConvocato=2095&squadra=2

Italian footballers
Italy under-21 international footballers
S.S.C. Bari players
Como 1907 players
Treviso F.B.C. 1993 players
Hellas Verona F.C. players
A.C. Perugia Calcio players
Serie A players
Serie B players
Association football forwards
Footballers from Bari
1981 births
Living people
S.S. Fidelis Andria 1928 players
A.S. Bisceglie Calcio 1913 players